Terence Gerald Denyer (born 26 May 1981) is a former Zimbabwean cricketer. Born in Umtali (now Mutare), he is a right-handed batsman and right-arm leg break bowler. He played nine first-class matches in the Logan Cup for his home province Manicaland between 2000 and 2001.

References

External links
 
 

1981 births
Living people
Cricketers from Mutare
Manicaland cricketers
Zimbabwean cricketers